Curlew is the eponymously titled debut studio album by Curlew, released in 1981 by Landslide Records.

Track listing

Personnel 
Curlew
Bill Bacon – drums, gamelan, percussion
George Cartwright – flute, saxophone
Tom Cora – cello, mixing (A1-A3, A5, B2-B6)
Bill Laswell – bass guitar
Nicky Skopelitis – guitar
Technical personnel
Martin Bisi – recording, mixing (A4, B1)
Curlew – producer
Michael Lytle – mixing, recording (A1-A4, B1-B3, B5, B6)
John Slagel – editing

Release history

References

External links 
 

1981 albums
Curlew (band) albums